ARDS commonly refers to Acute respiratory distress syndrome

ARDs commonly refers to age-related diseases

ARDS and Ards may also refer to:

Places
 Ards Peninsula, Northern Ireland
 Ards (territory), several historical territorial divisions on the Ards Peninsula
 Ards Lower, a barony in Northern Ireland
 Ards Upper, a barony in Northern Ireland
 Ards and North Down, current administrative district on the Ards Peninsula
 Ards (borough), former administrative district
 Ards (Northern Ireland Parliament constituency), former constituency
 Ards Forest Park, a nature reserve in County Donegal, Ireland
 Newtownards, a town in Northern Ireland, nicknamed "Ards"

Organizations
 Ards Community Hospital, a health facility in Newtownards, Northern Ireland
 Ards F.C., a Northern Irish football club from Newtownards
 Ards RFC, a Northern Irish rugby football club from Newtownards

Other uses
 Advanced Remote Display Station, an early computer terminal
 Ards Circuit, a motor racing circuit

See also
 ARD (disambiguation)